Paul Capdeville was the defending champion but decided not to participate.
Matteo Viola won the title, defeating Guido Pella 6–4, 6–1 in the final.

Seeds

Draw

Finals

Top half

Bottom half

References
 Main Draw
 Qualifying Draw

Challenger Ciudad de Guayaquil - Singles
2011 Singles